Thomas John Honeyman (10 June 1891 – 5 July 1971) was an art dealer and gallery director, becoming the most acclaimed director of Kelvingrove Art Gallery and Museum, Glasgow. 

Born near Queen's Park, Glasgow, the son of a life insurance manager Thomas Honeyman (1858–1934) and Elsie Smith (1860–1937), Tom Honeyman studied medicine, graduating at Glasgow University prior to distinguished service with the RAMC overseas in the First World War. He practised medicine in the East End of Glasgow, before becoming an art dealer in Glasgow with Alex Reid & Lefevre before moving three years later to London to be based at the Lefevre Gallery.  

In Glasgow and London he met many great artists and when Glasgow Corporation were looking for a new Director for their Kelvingrove Art Gallery & Museum they consulted Honeyman about possible candidates. He eventually decided he might like the job. Taking up the post in 1939. Honeyman went on to make an enormous contribution to artistic and cultural life of Glasgow during his 15 years in the post. He greatly increased the standing and profile of the Glasgow Art Galleries & Museums through high profile publicity and successful exhibitions which, for example, brought queues to see Van Gogh's paintings, and numerous other special exhibitions.

His art purchases were prudent and wise, buying works which have subsequently gained enormously in value. In 1952, Honeyman became famous for his purchase of Salvador Dalí's Christ of St. John of the Cross. A controversial purchase at the time, both because of its exceptional cost (£8,200) and contemporary style, it hung for many years in Kelvingrove where it still hangs. It is one of the many jewels of the city's art collection and has proven commercially remunerative, with displays and reproduction fees covering the original cost several times over.
 
His reputation was such that he was able to attract major gifts to the gallery, including that of Sir William Burrell (1861–1958) in 1944. It is known internationally as the Burrell Collection. In the same year he was instrumental in establishing the Glasgow Art Galleries & Museums Association, an independent charitable society, with membership open to all, to encourage and enhance the enjoyment and public use of art galleries and museums. It continues today as the Friends of Glasgow Museums. In 1948 he originated the publication by the association of the quarterly arts magazine The Scottish Art Review which continued for over 40 years. It started in 1947 as the Glasgow Art Review. 

In 1953 he was elected Rector of the University of Glasgow. Yet, Honeyman, with great experience and the support of the public,  was forced to leave his post in 1954 having lost the support of his political master, the new chairman of the Glasgow Corporation Art Committee. 

Passionate about the cultural life of Glasgow, Tom Honeyman, in partnership with playwright James Bridie and cinema entrepreuner George Singleton,  founded the Glasgow Citizen's Theatre. Together with Bridie, Honeyman was a founder of the Arts Council in Scotland. He was also a founder member of the Scottish Tourist Board. Honeyman wrote an autobiographical book, largely memoirs of his time as Director of the Art Gallery, called Art and Audacity (Collins, 1971). He was the subject of a further book From Dali to Burrell; The Tom Honeyman Story by Jack Webster, published in 1997 by Black &White.

Tom Honeyman was the recipient of the 1943 St Mungo Prize, awarded to the individual who has done most in the previous three years to improve and promote the city of Glasgow.

References

1891 births
1971 deaths
British art curators
British Army personnel of World War I
People from Gorbals
Culture in Glasgow
Rectors of the University of Glasgow
People educated at Queen's Park Secondary School